Settiner See is a lake in the Ludwigslust-Parchim district in Mecklenburg-Vorpommern, Germany. At an elevation of 42 m, its surface area is 0.5 km2.

Lakes of Mecklenburg-Western Pomerania